Samsung Galaxy On7 Pro is an Android smartphone produced by Samsung Electronics. It was unveiled and released in October 2016.It has a 64-bit System on Chip (SoC) and  2 or 3GB RAM. The Galaxy On7 Pro has a 13 Megapixel rear camera and a front facing 5 Megapixel. Rear camera are equipped with LED flash.

References

External links 
 Official Website

Android (operating system) devices
Samsung mobile phones
Samsung smartphones
Mobile phones introduced in 2015
Samsung Galaxy